Joanne Ekamdeiya Gobure (born April 26, 1982 in Nauru) is a Nauruan poet.

Biography
Gobure was born in Denigomodu and settled in a district of Uaboe. Gobure is the cousin of Nauruan tennis player Chris Gobure, who played in the South Pacific Games with Paner Baguga and others.

She attended schools of Nibok, Aiwo and Yaren and graduated with the Nauru Junior Certificate.

Since 2003, Gobure has worked mainly as a teacher at Nauru College, at Aiwo. She was employed by the director of the school, Richard Lewis, and by the education minister, Baron D. Waqa, as an IT teacher.  Although she has not finished college education course, she is studying at the local campus of the University of South Pacific (USP). She mainly provides training to work with Microsoft Office. She additionally works at Nibok Infant School as a teacher.

Gobure writes poetry, overwhelmingly in the English language.  While most of Gobure's works are little known outside of Nauru, "A Beautiful Prayer" is a poem which has garnered some attention, particularly because it had been running through several internet forums and Christian websites.

In common with some other contemporary Oceanic writers (e.g., such as Afaese Manoa of Tuvalu), Gobure has the reputation of a writer with a very strong sense of religious vocation.

External links
 Text of Joanne Gobure's 'A Beautiful Prayer'

1982 births
Living people
Nauruan women writers
Nauruan Christians
People from Uaboe District
People from Denigomodu District
Nauruan poets
Nauruan educators
21st-century poets
21st-century women writers